This list of gas carrier ships includes LPG carriers and LNG carriers. Ships with multiple names may be listed under each name.

A
 Al Barrah
 Al Dafna
 Al Jabirah
 Al Oraic
 Al Rayyan
 Al Thakhira
 Ayame
 Almarona
 Artemis Gas
 Alrar
 Althea Gas
 Anafi
 Annapurna
 Antwerpen
 Arctic Discoverer
 Armada LNG Mediterrana
 Asia Excellence
 Australgas
 Aurora Capricorn
 Azeri Gas
 Al Utouriya
 Al Thumama
 Al Sahla
 Aseem (SCI)

B
 Berlian Ekuator
 Berge Ningbo
 Berge Nantong
 British Commerce
 British Councillor
 British Commerce
 British Courage
 British Diamond
 British Emerald
 British Innovator
 British Merchant
 British Ruby
 British Sapphire
 British Trader
 BW Gemini
 BW TYR
 BW ELM

● BW Empress (Ex-Yuyo Berge)

D
 Disha (SCI)
 Devonshire

E
 Excellence
 Excelsior
 Excel
 Exemplar
 Expedient
 Experience
 Explorer
 Express

F
 Flanders Loyalty
 Flanders Liberty
 Flanders Harmony
 Fuji LNG

G
Gaz Venezia
Gas Al Ahmadiah 
Gas Umm Al Rowaisat
Gas Al Mubarakiah 
Gas Al Negeh 
Gas Al Kuwait II
Gaz Victory
gas miracle
gas magic
gas cat
gas lıne
gandria
gimi
golar arctic
golar celsius
golar freeze
golar grand
golar mazo
golar maria
golar seal
golar spirit
golar viking
golar winter
gas courage
gas commerce
gas stella
Grace Cosmos
Grace Acacia
Gas Diana

H
 hellas nautilus
 Hampshire

I
Iris Glory
Independence (2014)

J
Jag vidhi
Jag vishnu
Jag Vijaya
Jag Viraat
Jag Vasanth
Jag Vayu

K
. Kailash Gas
. Kent

L
 Luke
 Lyne
 Leto providence

M
Maharshi Labhatreya
Maharshi Shubhatreya
Maharshi Krishnatreya
Maharshi Devatreya
Maharshi Vamadeva
Maharshi Bhardwaj
Maharshi Devatreya
Maersk Venture
Maersk Jade
Marshal Vasilevskiy
Marycam Swan
Mill Reef
Mill House
Maersk jewel
Maersk Genesis
Maersk Galaxy
Maersk Gusto
Maersk Global
Maersk Glory
Maersk Visual
Maersk Value
Methane Princess
Malanje

N
 Navigator Centauri
 Navigator Ceres
 Navigator Ceto
 Navigator Copernico
 Nippon Yusen Kaisha
 Norgas Innovation
 Norgas Unikum
 Norgas Bahrain Vision
 Norgas Invention
 Norgas Creation
 Norgas Conception

O
ocean orchid

P
 Pertamina Gas 1 (Largest VLGC Ship in the world)
 Perseverance V
 Progress
 Prospect (BW Odin / Aurora Capricorn)
 Pacific Arcadia
 Pampero

Q

R
Raahi(SCI)

S
 Secreto
 Sylvie
 Sigas Sonja
 Sigas Silvia
 Sir Ivor
 Stena Blue Sky
 Stena Clear Sky
 Stena Crystal Sky
 SKARPOV
 Sansovino
 Seri Bijaksana
 Soyo
 Staffordshire
 Serjeant
 Sinndar
 Suiso Frontier

T
Thetis Glory
Tenacity IV

U

V
Venus Glory

W
 Wiltshire

X

Y
 Yuhsan
 Yuyo
 Yuyo Spirits

Z
Zekreet

See also
 Gas carrier
 LNG carrier
Nizwa LNG

References

External links
 World LPG carrier fleet(as of 1 May 2010)
 World LPG Fleet(as of November 16, 2009)

Tankers